St. John Cantius Parish is a former Roman Catholic Parish designated for Polish immigrants in Northampton, Massachusetts, United States.

It was founded 1904. It is one of the Polish-American Roman Catholic parishes in New England in the Diocese of Springfield in Massachusetts.

The parish merged with the Sacred Heart Parish in April 2010.

Bibliography 
 
 The Official Catholic Directory in USA

Further reading

External links 
  St. John Cantius - Diocesan information (archived)

Roman Catholic parishes of Diocese of Springfield in Massachusetts
Polish-American Roman Catholic parishes in Massachusetts